Arsenio is an Italian, Portuguese and Spanish version of the male given name Arsenius. It may refer to:

People 
 Arsenio Balisacan, Filipino economist
 Arsénio Bano (born 1974), East Timorese politician
 Arsenio Benítez (born 1971), Paraguayan footballer
 Arsenio Chaparro Cardoso (born 1960), Colombian racing cyclist
 Arsenio Chirinos (1934–2015), Venezuelan cyclist
 Arsenio Climaco (1870–1952), Filipino politician
 Arsenio Corsellas (1933–2019), Spanish voice actor
 Arsenio Cruz Herrera (1863–1917), Filipino politician
 Arsénio Duarte (1925–1986), Portuguese footballer
 Arsenio da Trigolo (1849–1909), Italian Roman Catholic priest
 Arsenio Erico (1915–1977), Paraguayan footballer
 Arsenio Farell (1921–2005), Mexican lawyer and politician
 Arsenio Fernández de Mesa (born 1955), Spanish politician
 Arsenio Frugoni (1914–1970), Italian medieval historian
 Arsenio González (born 1960), Spanish cyclist
 Arsenio Halfhuid (born 1991), Dutch footballer
 Arsenio Hall (born 1956), American entertainer
 Arsenio Iglesias (born 1930), Spanish footballer
 Arsenio Jazmin (born 1935), Filipino sprinter
 Arsenio Lacson (1912–1962), Filipino journalist and politician
 Arsenio Laurel (1931–1967), race car driver
 Arsenio Linares y Pombo (1848–1914), Spanish military officer and government official
 Arsenio Luzardo (born 1959), Uruguayan footballer
 Arsenio López (born 1979), Puerto Rican swimmer
 Arsenio Martínez Campos (1831–1900), Spanish officer
 Arsénio Nunes (born 1989), Portuguese footballer
 Arsénio Pompílio Pompeu de Carpo (1792–1869), Portuguese slave trader
 Arsenio Rodríguez (1911–1970), Cuban musician
 Arsenio Snijders (born 1990), Dutch footballer
 Arsenio Valpoort (born 1992), Dutch footballer
 E. Arsenio Manuel (1909–2003), Philippine historian and anthropologist

See also 
 
 The Arsenio Hall Show - late night talk show often referred to as Arsenio
 Arsenio (TV series), 1997 American situation comedy
 Arsenios Autoreianos (c. 1200–1273), Ecumenical Patriarch of Constantinople
 Linda Arsenio (born 1978), American actress and model 
 Raúl Arsenio Oviedo, town in Paraguay
 Sant'Arsenio, town in Italy

References 

Italian masculine given names
Portuguese masculine given names
Spanish masculine given names